James Dowdeswell (born 23 May 1974 in Bristol) is a comedian. He is also a writer and actor, best known for playing the character of Count Fuckula in the BBC television programme Extras.

James is also a published author. He wrote 'The Pub Manifesto: A Comedian Stands Up For Pubs' which was published by CAMRA Books in November 2018.

Television Credits

 Extras (BBC)
 Russell Howard's Good News (BBC)
 Celebrity Deal Or No Deal with Jimmy Carr (C4)
 Olympics Greatest Moments (BBC)
 Somersby Cider Advert (RSA)
 McDonald's Louisiana Advert
 Top Ten Moments for Goal.com
 Jongleurs Live (Loaded TV)
 The World Stands Up (Paramount)
 Edinburgh and Beyond (Paramount)
 Roadrunner (BBC Pilot)
 Jamie Cullum "I’m All Over It Now" Video
 Rekindle (Short Film) Chaos (Sketch Show Pilot)
 Why Did The Chicken (HTV Wales)
 The Wine Squad – Channel 31, Australia

External links

English male television actors
Alumni of Swansea University
Living people
1974 births